Vitali Gussev (born 16 March 1983 in Tartu) is an Estonian professional footballer.

Club career
On 26 February 2010, Gussev signed a three-and-a-half year deal with Romanian club FC Astra Ploieşti. He made the debut for his new club two days later against FC Brașov, helping his team to a 2–1 victory.

International career
Gussev made his international debut on 29 May 2009 in a friendly match against Wales.

Personal life
Gussev is 1.86 m tall and weighs 73 kg. He has a younger brother, Vladislav Gussev, who also plays football.

Honours

Club
Levadia Tallinn 
Meistriliiga: 2009

Individual
Meistriliiga top scorer: 2009
Esiliiga Player of the Year: 2017

References

External links
 
 
 

1983 births
Sportspeople from Tartu
Living people
Tartu JK Tammeka players
FC TVMK players
Trelleborgs FF players
FBK Kaunas footballers
Estonia international footballers
Estonian footballers
Estonian expatriate footballers
Estonian people of Russian descent
Expatriate footballers in Sweden
Estonian expatriate sportspeople in Sweden
Expatriate footballers in Lithuania
Estonian expatriate sportspeople in Lithuania
Expatriate footballers in Romania
Estonian expatriate sportspeople in Romania
FC Astra Giurgiu players
Liga I players
JK Narva Trans players
Allsvenskan players
Meistriliiga players
Association football forwards
Maardu Linnameeskond players
Estonia under-21 international footballers
FC Kiviõli Irbis players
Ida-Virumaa FC Alliance players
JK Maag Tartu players